Francis Henry Taylor (1903–1957) was a distinguished American museum director and curator, who served as the director of the Metropolitan Museum of Art for fifteen years.

He was born in Philadelphia, and started his career as a curator at the Philadelphia Museum of Art. In 1931 he became director of the Worcester Art Museum Massachusetts, before joining the Metropolitan Museum in New York City as its director in 1940.

Sometimes described as a showman, he developed a theory of the museum as an institution of active public service, not simply a repository of art. He was credited with doubling the number of people visiting the museum, up to 2.3 million a year.

Books
His writings include:
 Babel's Tower: The Dilemma of the Modern Museum (1945)
 The Taste of Angels: A History of Art Collecting from Rameses to Napoleon (1948, reprint 1955) - 
 Fifty Centuries of Art (1954)
 Pierpont Morgan as Collector and Patron, 1837-1913 (1957), Pierpont Morgan Library -

See also
Monuments, Fine Arts, and Archives program

References

External links
 Image of Francis Henry Taylor, Smithsonian Archives of American Art
Francis Henry Taylor records, 1892-1956 from the Metropolitan Museum of Art Archives, New York.
 Photo by Yousuf Karsh

Francis Henry Taylor papers, 1920-1958 from Houghton Library, Harvard College Library.

1903 births
1957 deaths
People from Philadelphia
American art curators
Directors of the Metropolitan Museum of Art
People associated with the Worcester Art Museum
Directors of museums in the United States
People associated with the Philadelphia Museum of Art